Gerard Leever (born 30 April 1960, Naarden) is a Dutch cartoonist. He is the winner of the 2006 Stripschapprijs.

References

1960 births
Living people
Dutch cartoonists
People from Naarden
Winners of the Stripschapsprijs
20th-century Dutch male artists